Queen + Paul Rodgers Tour (also known as Return of the Champions Tour) was the first world concert tour by Queen guitarist Brian May and drummer Roger Taylor, joined by singer Paul Rodgers under the moniker of Queen + Paul Rodgers. The tour was Queen's first since The Magic Tour in 1986, and the death of lead singer Freddie Mercury in November 1991. The band's drummer Roger Taylor commented; "We never thought we would tour again, Paul (Rodgers) came along by chance and we seemed to have a chemistry. Paul is just such a great singer. He's not trying to be Freddie." Bassist John Deacon also did not take part due to his retirement in 1997.

History
The origins of the collaboration came when Brian May played at the Fender Strat Pack concert in 2004. Now for the first time, he joined Paul Rodgers for a rendition of Free's classic, "All Right Now". After this Brian spoke of a chemistry between the two of them. Following this, Brian invited Paul to play with Queen at their induction to the UK Music Hall of Fame. Again citing a new excitement with Rodgers, the three announced they would tour in 2005. The tour originally was meant only to include Europe and the 46664 concerts of that year. However at the end of the European tour, some dates in the USA and Japan were added. In 2006, a full scale US tour was undertaken.

The show
 
The stage design for the tour was created by Mark Fisher and was minimal, lacking a large backing screen that would later be featured on the Rock The Cosmos Tour, and elaborate stage theatrics. Four very large, custom-built moving spotlights sat behind the stage, each containing a 3000-watt xenon bulb and operated by a crewperson. A large 'B Stage' was constructed out from the main stage, into the audience which would frequently be used for acoustic performances by all the members of the band. The show began with the Eminem song "Lose Yourself" being played over the PA system, and a dance-theme remix of the Queen song It's A Beautiful Day. Toward the end of "Lose Yourself", the guitar would join in from behind a large curtain which covered the band from view, before Rodgers would appear singing a shortened version of the song "Reachin' Out". Thought by many fans to be a new song, it was a charity song that both Brian and Paul had played together on in the 1990s. Brian would appear after, playing the introductory riff to "Tie Your Mother Down", before the curtain fell and the band would perform the full song.

The first segment of the concert consisted largely of Queen hits and some of Rodgers' songs. To introduce "Fat Bottomed Girls", Brian would play the introductory riff from the earlier Queen song "White Man". Rodgers often played a muted steel string guitar on "Crazy Little Thing Called Love". An acoustic section would follow, Taylor leaving the kit at times to sing "Say It's Not True" on the B-Stage, while Brian would play acoustic Queen songs such as "Love of My Life" and "39". At the Hyde Park concert, John Lennon's song "Imagine" was added to the setlist, being played after "Love of My Life", in response to the recent bombings in London. A unique version of "Hammer To Fall" would be played, which featured a slower and mellower first verse sung by May and Rodgers. The second half of the song would be played as a full band, depending on the condition of his voice, Rodgers would also sing this section, or leave it to Taylor. Taylor would often play an intricate cover of Sandy Nelson drum instrumental "Let There Be Drums", followed by a performance of "I'm in Love with My Car", with Taylor taking lead vocals and the drum parts.

A guitar solo by May would follow, with a band instrumental of "Last Horizon" playing, in which a large mirror ball was used. During the second half of the concert, Taylor would leave the kit to sing "These Are The Days Of Our Lives", with a screen playing nostalgic footage, including shots of the band on their early tours in Japan. "Radio GaGa" would follow, with Taylor singing the first and second verses, with drum samples from the studio version controlled by Edney. Rodgers would take the rest of the song, with Taylor playing live drums for the rest of the song. During "Bohemian Rhapsody", Freddie's vocal and piano part, along with video footage from Queen's 1986 show at Wembley Stadium would be used, while the rest of the band would play live music. After the operatic section, Rodgers would sing the heavy part, while the closing lines of the song would be an interchanging duet between Rodgers and Mercury. The song would end with Mercury taking a bow to the crowd, and the band would leave the stage. For the encore, a largely rigid line up of "The Show Must Go On", "All Right Now", "We Will Rock You" and "We Are The Champions" would be played, before the band would leave the stage, Taylor throwing his drumsticks into the audience.

Set list
This set list is representative of the performance on April 28, 2005 in Hamburg. It does not represent all concerts for the duration of the tour.

"Lose Yourself" (Tape)
"Reaching Out"
"Tie Your Mother Down"
"I Want to Break Free"
"Fat Bottomed Girls"
"Wishing Well"
"Crazy Little Thing Called Love"
"Say It's Not True"
"'39"
"Love of My Life"
"Hammer to Fall"
"Feel Like Makin' Love"
"Let There Be Drums"
"I'm in Love with My Car"
"Guitar Solo"

"Last Horizon"
"These Are the Days of Our Lives"
"Radio Ga Ga"
"Can't Get Enough"
"A Kind of Magic"
"I Want It All"
"Bohemian Rhapsody"
"The Show Must Go On"
Encore
"All Right Now"
"We Will Rock You"
"We Are the Champions"
"God Save The Queen" (Tape)

Tour dates

Cancellations

Notes

Tour band
Brian May – Lead guitar, vocals
Roger Taylor – Drums, percussion, vocals
Paul Rodgers – Lead vocals, guitar, piano
Freddie Mercury – Pre-recorded lead vocals

Additional musicians:
Spike Edney – Keyboards, backing vocals
Danny Miranda – Bass guitar, acoustic guitar, backing vocals
Jamie Moses – Rhythm guitar, backing vocals

References

External links
Queen Concerts
Queen + Paul Rodgers official site

2005 concert tours
2006 concert tours
Queen + Paul Rodgers concert tours